Steromphala rarilineata is a species of sea snail, a marine gastropod mollusk in the family Trochidae, the top snails.

Description
The size of the shell varies between 8 mm and 14 mm. The shell diverges from Gibbula divaricata by being smaller, and more conical, and having an angulate periphery and a flattened base.

Distribution
Steromphala rarilineata is found in relatively warm European waters off the coast of Spain, Greece, and Portugal; in the Black Sea off Ukraine; in the Atlantic Ocean off the Azores and the Canary Islands.

References

 Monterosato T. A. (di), 1875 (letta il 24. 1. 1875): Nuova rivista delle Conchiglie Mediterranee. (Catalogo delle Conchiglie Mediterranee); Atti dell'Accademia Palermitana di Scienze, Lettere ed Arti, Palermo (2) 5: 1–50
 Anistratenko V.V. & Starobogatov Y., 1991: Mollusks of the order Trochiformes (Gastropoda, Pectinibranchia) from the Black Sea and the Sea of Azov [in Russian with English summary]; Bulleten Moskovskogo obscestva ispytatelej priroda. Otdel biologiceskij 96(1): 65–71
 Gofas, S.; Le Renard, J.; Bouchet, P. (2001). Mollusca, in: Costello, M.J. et al. (Ed.) (2001). European register of marine species: a check-list of the marine species in Europe and a bibliography of guides to their identification. Collection Patrimoines Naturels, 50: pp. 180–213

External links
 
 Michaud A. L. G., 1829: Description de plusieurs espèces nouvelles de coquilles vivantes; Bulletin d'Histoire Naturelle de la Société Linnéenne de Bordeaux 3: 260–276, 1 pl
 Brusina S., 1865: Conchiglie dalmate inedite; Verhandlungen der Kaiserlich-königlichen Zoologisch-botanisch Gesellschaft in Wien 15: 3–42
 Affenzeller S., Haar N. & Steiner G. (2017). Revision of the genus complex Gibbula: an integrative approach to delineating the Eastern Mediterranean genera Gibbula Risso, 1826, Steromphala Gray, 1847, and Phorcus Risso, 1826 using DNA-barcoding and geometric morphometrics (Vetigastropoda, Trochoidea). Organisms Diversity & Evolution. 17(4): 789–812

rarilineata
Gastropods described in 1829